The ATP China Challenger International is a tennis tournament held in Wuhan, China since 2012. In 2011, it was held in Wuhai, China. The event is part of the ATP Challenger Tour and is played on hard courts.

Past finals

Singles

Doubles

References

External links

ATP Challenger Tour
Tennis tournaments in China
Hard court tennis tournaments
Wuhai Challenger